D30 may refer to:

Vehicles

Aircraft 
 Dewoitine D.30, a French passenger monoplane

Ships 
 , a Pará-class destroyer of the Brazilian Navy
 , a Garcia-class destroyer of the Brazilian Navy
 , a Danae-class light cruiser of the Royal Navy
 , a W-class destroyer of the Royal Navy

Surface vehicles 
 Levdeo D30, a Chinese hatchback
 LNER Class D30, a class of British steam locomotives

Other uses 
 122 mm howitzer 2A18 (D-30), a Soviet howitzer
 Canon EOS D30, a digital single lens reflex camera
 D30 road (Croatia)
 Queen's Gambit Declined, a chess opening
 Soloviev D-30, a Soviet turbofan engine
 d30, a die with 30 sides

See also 
 D3O, with a letter "O" instead of a zero